Gobiopsis is a genus of fish in the family Gobiidae native to the Indian and Pacific Ocean.

Species
There are currently 15 recognized species in this genus:
 Gobiopsis angustifrons Lachner & McKinney, 1978 (Narrow-nape barbelgoby)
 Gobiopsis arenaria (Snyder, 1908) (Patch-work barbelgoby)
 Gobiopsis atrata (Griffin, 1933) (New Zealand barbelgoby)
 Gobiopsis bravoi (Herre, 1940) (Bravo's barbelgoby)
 Gobiopsis canalis Lachner & McKinney, 1978 (Checkered barbelgoby)
 Gobiopsis exigua Lachner & McKinney, 1979
 Gobiopsis liolepis (Koumans, 1931) 
 Gobiopsis macrostoma Steindachner, 1861 (Long-jaw barbelgoby)
 Gobiopsis malekulae (Herre, 1935) (Striped barbelgoby)
 Gobiopsis namnas Shibukawa, 2010
 Gobiopsis pinto (J. L. B. Smith, 1947) (Snake-head barbelgoby)
 Gobiopsis quinquecincta (H. M. Smith, 1931) (Five-band barbelgoby)
 Gobiopsis springeri Lachner & McKinney, 1979 (Springer's barbelgoby)
 Gobiopsis uranophilus Prokofiev, 2016 
 Gobiopsis woodsi Lachner & McKinney, 1978 (Woods' barbelgoby)

References

Gobiinae
Marine fish genera
Taxa named by Franz Steindachner